Norwegian County Road 406 (Fv 406) is a Norwegian county road in Birkenes municipality in Agder county, Norway. The road connects to the Norwegian County Road 405 at Stemlona and it connects to the Norwegian National Road 41 at its other end at Sennumstad. The road runs through a fairly rural area in Birkenes. The Sørlandsbanen railway line crosses over the road at Fidje.

References

406
Road transport in Agder
Birkenes